Highland College was a Christian liberal arts college in Pasadena, California, United States. It was located at 450 Avenue 64, Pasadena, California 91105.

History
Highland College was founded under the leadership of the Dr. Clyde J. Kennedy on May 4, 1950 as an agency of the Bible Presbyterian Church. The Annandale Country Club property was purchased and used as the campus. Subsequently, Robert G. Rayburn became president.

On March 1, 1955, Rayburn was dismissed. Consequently, a split occurred and led to the establishment of Covenant College.

Notable alumni
 Francis Schaeffer

Leadership
 John E. Carson (1950-1952)
 Robert G. Rayburn (1952–1955)
 Lynn Gray Gordon (1955–1957)
 Robert E. Kofahl (1957–unknown)

References

Educational institutions established in 1950
Seminaries and theological colleges in California
Education in Pasadena, California
1950 establishments in California